In the run up to the Indian general election, 2019, various organisations carried out opinion polls to gauge voting intention in India. Results of such polls are displayed in this article. The date range for these opinion polls are from the Jan 2018 to April 2019.  Many organisations have gone on to conduct exit polls and post-poll surveys as well, which too are displayed.

Background
Opinion polls in India can be controversial. These charges include partisan manipulation.

Opinion poll methodology has heavily improved and agencies like CSDS have got it absolutely correct on 16 occasions, roughly correct on 7 occasions and wrong on 4 occasions.

Post-poll surveys, widely published, are fundamentally different from opinion polls.

Opinion polling 

Various organisations have carried out opinion polling to gauge voting intentions in India. Results of such polls are displayed in this list. The date range for these opinion polls is from the previous general election, held in April and May 2014, to the present day. The ECI banned the release of exit polls from 11 April to 19 May, the last phase of the elections. The commission also banned the publication or broadcast in the media of predictions made by astrologers and tarot card readers.

Vote share

Polling on politicians

Next Prime Minister

Best Alternative to Narendra Modi amongst the Opposition leaders in 2019 Election

Narendra Modi vs Rahul Gandhi

Narendra Modi vs Priyanka Gandhi Vadra

Approval ratings

Economic performance; compared to previous government

Issues

Key Issues

Farm distress; Low crop causing farm distress

Jobs; Enough created

Alleged corruption in Rafale deal

Statewise opinion polling

Andhra Pradesh (25)

Arunachal Pradesh (2)

Assam (14)

Bihar (40)

Chhattisgarh (11)

Goa (2)

Gujarat (26)

Haryana (10)

Himachal Pradesh (4)

Jammu and Kashmir (6)

Jharkhand (14)

Karnataka (28)

Kerala (20)

Madhya Pradesh (29)

Maharashtra (48)

Manipur (2)

Meghalaya (2)

Mizoram (1)

Nagaland (1)

Odisha (21)

Punjab (13)

Rajasthan (25)

Sikkim (1)

Tamil Nadu (39)

AIADMK is part of NDA alliance in Tamil Nadu.

Telangana (17)

Tripura (2)

Uttar Pradesh (80)

Uttarakhand (5)

West Bengal (42)

Union territories

Andaman and Nicobar Islands (1)

Chandigarh (1)

Dadra and Nagar Haveli (1)

Daman and Diu (1)

Lakshadweep (1)

Puducherry (1)

NCT of Delhi (7)

See also 
 Opinion polling for the 2014 Indian general election

References

External links
Election Commission of India website
Lok Sabha (General) Elections 2019 Date, Seats, Opinion Poll, Results

2019 Indian general election
Opinion polling in India
India